"You're Too Late" is a song by Fantasy from their self-titled album and was written and produced by Tony Valor, whose real name is Anthony S. Tabbita.

The song went to number one for one week on the Billboard disco/dance chart in 1981. The single also peaked at #28 on the R&B chart.

References

1980 singles
1980 songs
1981 singles
Disco songs
Epic Records singles